Miseration is a Swedish death metal band formed in 2006. Their lyrics primarily deal with themes of inner struggles and religious conflict. The band is one out of a collection of collaborations with both former Crimson Moonlight guitarist Jani Stefanovic and former Scar Symmetry vocalist Christian Älvestam; for example, both also play with Solution .45.

History
Miserations' first album, Your Demons – Their Angels, was released 20 September 2008.

The band recorded their second album, titled The Mirroring Shadow, at Panic-Room studios with producer Tomas "Plec" Johansson. It was released through Lifeforce Records on 16 November 2009. 

The band's third album, Tragedy Has Spoken, was released in 2012. Their first album in ten years, Black Miracles and Dark Wonders, is expected to be released on 22 April 2022.

Lyrical themes
Brian Sweeney of Metal Review wrote "There has been some debate over whether Miseration is a Christian band. "Most of the music and lyrics were written by guitarist Jani Stefanovic (Divinefire, Essence of Sorrow) for a band called Renascent, which he co-founded, then quit early on, taking his songs with him to Miseration. Stefanovic is a big-time Christian, along with everybody else in the band except vocalist Alvestam. So, in deference to the singer’s absence of faith, songwriter Stefanovic toned down what might have otherwise been mega-Christian lyrics to thinly veiled Christian lyrics. But they’re technically in the realm of religio-neutrality. Technically."

Members
Current
 Christian Älvestam (2006–present) – lead vocals
 Jani Stefanovic (2006–2010, 2011–present) – lead guitar, bass, drums, rhythm guitar

Former
 Tobias Alpadie (2010–2011) – lead guitar
 Johan Ylenstrand (2006–2011) – bass guitar
 Rolf "Stuka" Pilve (2006–2011) – drums
 Marcus "Skägget" Bertilsson (2006–2019) – rhythm guitar
 Oskar Nilsson (2011–2019) – drums
 Christian Lundgren (2012–2019) – bass guitar

Timeline

Discography
 Your Demons – Their Angels (2007)
 The Mirroring Shadow (2009)
 Tragedy Has Spoken (2012)
 Black Miracles and Dark Wonders (2022)

References

Swedish death metal musical groups